The Personal Internet Communicator (PIC) is a consumer device released by AMD in 2004 to allow people in emerging countries access to the internet. Originally part of AMD's 50x15 Initiative, the PIC has been deployed by Internet service providers (ISPs) in several developing countries. It is based on an AMD Geode CPU and uses Microsoft Windows CE and Microsoft Internet Explorer 6.

The fanless PC runs the low-power Geode x86 processor and is equipped with 128 MB DDR memory and a 10 GB 3.5-inch hard drive. The device's price is $185 with a keyboard, mouse, and preinstalled software for basic personal computing and internet/email access and $249 with a monitor included.

Transfer to Data Evolution Corporation
AMD stopped work on the Personal Internet Communicator project after nearly two years of planning and development. In December 2006 AMD transferred PIC manufacturing assets to Data Evolution Corporation and the device was then marketed as the decTOP.

The PIC is branded, marketed, and sold by local service providers such as telecommunications companies and government-sponsored communications programs. AMD owns the design of the PIC, but the device is currently manufactured by Solectron, a high volume contract manufacturing specialist. Other companies integrated into the development include Seagate and Samsung. The ISPs include the Tata Group (India), CRC (México), Telmex (México), and Cable and Wireless (in the Caribbean).

Technology

Hardware
The device is designed for minimal cost like a consumer audio/video appliance, is not internally expandable, and comes equipped with a minimum set of interfaces which include a VGA graphics display interface, four USB 1.1 ports, a built-in 56 kbit/s ITU v.92 Fax/Modem and an AC'97 audio interface providing sound capabilities. There is also an IDE-connector and the case can house a normal 3.5" HDD.

Hardware specifications 
 AMD Geode GX 500@1.0W processor, 366 MHz clock rate
 128 MBytes DDR RAM (Up to 512 MBytes)
 VGA display interface up to 1600x1200
 four USB 1.1 ports
 56 kbit/s ITU v.92 Fax/Modem
 AC'97 audio interface
 Fanless design.

Electrical specifications 
 Input Voltage: 12 VDC (Factory provided AC/DC converter)
 Power Dissipation: 8 Watts (plus power supply's own dissipation)
 Total power Dissipation: 12.7 Watts @ 100% CPU Load

Software

Firmware
The decTOP's original BIOS does not allow any human interaction during POST at boot time. Therefore, it is not possible to format and re-install any other operating system. Any attempts to install a different OS, even when extracting the disk from the main chassis fail, since BIOS would look for WinCE's main boot file.

Operating system
AMD's PIC 50x15 was originally delivered with Windows CE 5.0 pre-installed in two partitions. The working (bootable) partition was allowed to boot normally, but when it failed, the BIOS would recover the partition's base-installation from a backup recovery disk in a small partition in the disk.

When re-flashed with a more forgiving BIOS, the decTOP allows the user to install any x86-compatible operating system desired (32 bits only). It is known to work with any Linux distribution, as well as Windows XP and other versions. However, upgrading the unit's main memory to 512 MBytes is recommended for reliable operation.

See also
 OLPC XO-1
 Classmate PC
 VIA pc-1 Initiative

References

External links
 
 

Appropriate technology
Information appliances
Information and communication technologies for development
Mobile computers
Windows CE devices